Cynthia Mathez (born 10 October 1985) is a Swiss para-badminton player and curler who competes in the WH1 category. Mathez is part of the Swiss national para-badminton team and won gold at the European Para Badminton Championships with her doubles partner Karin Suter-Erath in Rodez in 2018. She competed in the 2020 Summer Paralympics in Tokyo.

Career
Mathez was initially active as a judoka, rugby player and racing driver. In 2009, she was diagnosed with multiple sclerosis and since 2015, she has been dependent on a wheelchair. She initially wanted to compete in wheelchair rugby, but her doctors expressed concerns. Then she turned to parabadminton.

Mathez first took part in a BWF Para-Badminton World Championships in Ulsan in 2017 and reached the quarter-finals in doubles with Karin Suter-Erath. In mixed doubles, she was eliminated from the group stage with Christian Hamböck. In 2018, she was successful at the European Championships in Rodez and won gold in doubles with Karin Suter-Erath, while in singles, she was eliminated in the quarter-finals. At the 2019 World Championship in Basel, she was eliminated in the women's and mixed doubles in the group stage. 

Mathez participated in the 2020 Summer Paralympics in the women's singles WH1 and women's doubles WH1–WH2 events. At the 2022 Winter Paralympics in Beijing, she took part as the lead for the Swiss curling team.

Achievements

World Championships 
Women's singles

Women's doubles

European Championships 
Women's doubles

BWF Para Badminton World Circuit (5 runners-up) 
The BWF Para Badminton World Circuit – Grade 2, Level 1, 2 and 3 tournaments has been sanctioned by the Badminton World Federation from 2022.

Men's singles

Men's doubles

International Tournaments (1 title, 6 runners-up) 
Women's singles

Women's doubles

Mixed doubles

References

External links

 Cynthia Mathez website
 Cynthia Mathez - Swiss Paralympic - Biografie - Resultate

Notes 

1985 births
Living people
Swiss female badminton players
Swiss para-badminton players
Swiss female curlers
Swiss wheelchair curlers
Paralympic badminton players of Switzerland
Paralympic wheelchair curlers of Switzerland
Badminton players at the 2020 Summer Paralympics
Wheelchair curlers at the 2022 Winter Paralympics
People with multiple sclerosis
21st-century Swiss women